The World Circus Side Show was a sideshow owned and operated by "Professor" Samuel Wagner from 1922 to 1941 on Surf Avenue, Coney Island, New York.

Known as "The Godfather" of the Coney Island Freak Show, Wagner was a contemporary of other sideshow and circus legends, such as the Ringling Brothers and P.T. Barnum. He endured a legal fight against the famed Robert Moses.  Moses, believing the age of sideshow entertainment was over, banned "Balyhoo and Outside Lecturers", which eventually and effectively put the sideshows out of business.

Notable acts 

Pip and Zip, pinheads
Prince Randian, a human torso
Lady Olga, bearded lady
Harry Bulson, The Spider Boy
Baby Doll, "Pulchritude Queen of the Avoirdupois," beautiful fat lady
Forrest Layman, an armless wonder
Flo Lambert, a contortionist
Myrtle Corbin
Warren Travis, "World's Strongest Man"
Bonita Barlowe, "Snake Enchantress"
Mr. X, "Electric Chair Dynamo"
Gibbs Sisters, conjoined twins
Major Mite, World's Smallest Individual"
Edna Price, neon tube swallower
Lady Voltese, "Electric Dynamo"
Stella, "Homeliest Woman in the World"
Chief Woo Do and his strange people, "Pseudo-primitive Tribe"
Uncle Charlie Parcansas, "Oldest man on Earth"
General Tom Thumb and Father, famous dwarves
Princess Marie, chimpanzee
Sealo, the seal boy
Lady Gladys, ventriloquist and expose of the headless girl illusion
Kukla, "The Bird Girl"
Ramona, "Europe's Miracle Sex Girl"

A few acts were featured in the 1932 film, Freaks.

References 

Coney Island
Sideshows